Modesty in medical settings refers to the practices and equipment used to preserve patient modesty in medical examination and clinics.

Tools for modesty

Prior to the invention of the stethoscope, a physician who wanted to perform auscultation to listen to heart sounds or noise inside a body would have to physically place their ear against the body of the person being examined. In 1816, male physician René Laennec invented the stethoscope as a way to respect the modesty of a female patient, as it would have been awkward for him to put his ear on her chest.

Hospital gowns increase modesty as compared to the patient presenting nude, but in the past have been odd clothing which exposes the body. Some contemporary changes to the design of hospital gowns are proposed.

Society and culture
In places with more cultural diversity it becomes more likely that people will make new and different requests for modesty in health care.

Special populations
Sometimes women do not access healthcare because of modesty concerns.

Muslims in non-Muslim societies sometimes make requests for modesty.

References

External links
patientmodesty.org/, a United States-based nonprofit organization advocating for modesty

Modesty
Medical privacy